Andrei Pakin (born January 3, 1978) is a Kyrgyzstani former swimmer, who specialized in middle-distance freestyle and in individual medley events. Pakin competed in two swimming events at the 2000 Summer Olympics in Sydney. He eclipsed a FINA B-cut of 2:09.26 (200 m individual medley) from the Russian Open Championships in Saint Petersburg. In the 4×200 m freestyle relay, Pakin, along with Aleksandr Shilin, Ivan Ivanov, and Russian import Dmitri Kuzmin, were disqualified from heat one for an early takeoff during the lead-off leg. The following day, in the 200 m individual medley, Pakin placed fortieth on the morning prelims. He posted a sterling time of 2:07.88 to overhaul a fast-pacing George Gleason of the Virgin Islands at the final turn and blister a top finish in heat one.

References

External links
 

1978 births
Living people
Kyrgyzstani male medley swimmers
Olympic swimmers of Kyrgyzstan
Swimmers at the 2000 Summer Olympics
Male medley swimmers
Sportspeople from Bishkek
Kyrgyzstani people of Russian descent